Nagaram is a 2007 Indian Malayalam film, directed by M. A. Nishad, starring Kalabhavan Mani, Biju Menon, Gopika and Lakshmi Sharma in the lead roles. Nagaram deals with social and environmental issues of utmost relevance. M.A. Nishad presented these issues in a story form.

Plot
Each and every city and town in Kerala are facing a severe problem because of disposal of tons of waste. The focus here is on Cochin Corporation which is facing a similar crisis on waste management. Lalgudy Nanappan has taken the quotation for waste removal, but he has not found any suitable place to dispose the waste. The Mayor of the city, Prof. Sreelatha Varma, a politician with ethics doesn't sanction Nanappan's bills and all the works associated comes to a stand still. At the same time mayor cannot answer to the questions raised by the opposition members. Nanappan has good support from many members inside the corporation. His supporters are opposition leader in the City Council Stephen, Parasuraman an MLA of the area, Advocate Eenasu who is a legal consultant to the ruling party, and the State Health Minister.

Nanappan decided to dump the garbage in Sivaramapuram village with the support of corrupted politicians. Sivaramapuram is a village of calm and serene beauty where people living peacefully away from corruptions and pollutions. Ponnayya Thevar's family owned three-fourths of the land in Sivaramapura. Majority of the villagers were farmers doing agriculture by leasing land from Thevar. Thevar was always hungry for making money. Lalgudy manages to impress Thevar by agreeing a big amount as rental for giving space for waste disposal. Waste from the city starts flowing to Sivaramapuram. The villagers are made to believe with the help of Vasukuttan, a popular peer group leader, that a Waste Treatment Plant will come very soon in the village, thus providing employment to many. They are unaware of the environmental problems that are soon to engulf them.

Cast

References

External links

2007 films
2000s Malayalam-language films
Films shot in Kochi
Films shot in Palakkad
Films directed by M. A. Nishad